The 2016–17 Melbourne Renegades WBBL season was the second in the team's history. Coached by Lachlan Stevens and captained by Rachel Priest, they competed in the WBBL's 2016–17 season.

Fixtures

Regular season

Ladder

Squad
Each WBBL|02 squad featured 15 active players, with an allowance of up to five marquee signings including a maximum of three from overseas. Australian marquees are classed as players who made at least ten limited-overs appearances for the national team between 1 July 2013 and 1 July 2016. The table below lists the Renegades players and their key stats (including runs scored, batting strike rate, wickets taken, economy rate, catches and stumpings) for the season.

References

2016–17 Women's Big Bash League season by team
Melbourne Renegades (WBBL)